Jade McCarthy (born July 20, 1980) is an American sportscaster for NBC Sports Boston who was a former anchor on ESPN's SportsCenter and former host of NESN Daily on NESN.

Early life
McCarthy was born in Newton, Massachusetts. As a child, she rode horses competitively for ten years. She grew up near Boston and attended Mount Holyoke College.

Career
McCarthy started her career at WGGB-TV in Springfield, Massachusetts. She then moved to WAFF, the NBC affiliate in Huntsville, Alabama. She was a sports anchor at WCAU in Philadelphia, where she won numerous Sports Emmy Awards. McCarthy joined NESN in early 2010; she was a part-time host and reporter for SportsDesk. After SportsDesk was canceled, she became the host of the network's new show NESN Daily.

McCarthy left NESN in August 2011 after her husband, Gordon Stead, got a job in Philadelphia. McCarthy returned to TV in September 2012, joining ESPN as an anchor for SportsCenter. On April 26, 2017, it was announced that ESPN was laying off around 100 on-air personalities, with McCarthy being one of the victims.

McCarthy joined NBC Sports Boston in September 2018 as host of the Opening Drive New England Patriots pregame show.

Personal life 
McCarthy is a Christian. McCarthy and Stead had a son in October 2011. They welcomed their second child, another boy, in August 2015. Their third child, a daughter, was born in July 2017.

References

External links
Jade McCarthy's blog - NESN.com
ESPNMediaZone Bio

Sports in Boston
People from Newton, Massachusetts
Living people
1980 births
Mount Holyoke College alumni